Varapatsorn Radarong (born 20 March 1988) is a Thai beach volleyball player. She competed at the 2012 Asian Beach Games in Haiyang, China.

References

External links
 
 

1988 births
Living people
Varapatsorn Radarong
Varapatsorn Radarong
Asian Games medalists in beach volleyball
Varapatsorn Radarong
Medalists at the 2014 Asian Games
Beach volleyball players at the 2014 Asian Games
Beach volleyball players at the 2018 Asian Games
Varapatsorn Radarong
Southeast Asian Games medalists in volleyball
Place of birth missing (living people)
Competitors at the 2011 Southeast Asian Games
Competitors at the 2019 Southeast Asian Games
Varapatsorn Radarong
Varapatsorn Radarong